Mathews Mor Timotheos (born 8 October 1972) is a Syriac Orthodox bishop, he was Metropolitan Patriarchal Secretary For Indian Affairs.

See also
Jacobite Syrian Christian Church
 Oriental Orthodox Church
 Saint Thomas Christians

References

Syriac Orthodox Church bishops
Indian Oriental Orthodox Christians
People from Alappuzha district
1972 births
Living people